Wilde Gera is a branch of the river Gera in Erfurt, Thuringia, Germany.

See also
List of rivers of Thuringia

Rivers of Thuringia
Rivers of Germany